Henk Benjamins (born 16 September 1945) is a Dutch racing cyclist. He rode in the 1970 Tour de France.

References

1945 births
Living people
Dutch male cyclists
Place of birth missing (living people)